Brachytrachelus is a weevil genus in the tribe Tanyrhynchini.

Species 
 Brachytrachelus opatrinus Lacordaire, T., 1863
 Brachytrachelus opatrinus Schoenherr, 1848
 Brachytrachelus porosus Fåhraeus, O.I., 1871

References 

 Bisby F.A., Roskov Y.R., Orrell T.M., Nicolson D., Paglinawan L.E., Bailly N., Kirk P.M., Bourgoin T., Baillargeon G., Ouvrard D. (red.) (2011). Species 2000 & ITIS Catalogue of Life: 2011 Annual Checklist.. Species 2000: Reading, UK.. Retrieved on 24 September 2012.

External links 

 
 imperialis.inhs.illinois.edu

Entiminae
Beetle genera